"I Can't Wait" is a song by American group Nu Shooz, included on the band's second album, Tha's Right (1985). The song was remixed by Dutch DJ and producer Peter Slaghuis: this remixed version is the one that appears on the group's 1986 album, Poolside.

In the United States, the remixed version of the song reached number one on the Billboard Hot Dance Club Play chart and number three on the Billboard Hot 100. In the United Kingdom and West Germany, the song reached number two, while in Canada, it peaked at number one. The single returned to the Billboard charts in 2015, where it peaked at number 17 on the Dance/Electronic Digital Songs chart.

Background
Instrumentalist John Smith would try to write songs in batches of 10 and have two a week ready for rehearsals in Portland, Oregon. He bought a new Teac-3440 4-track recorder in 1983, and "I Can't Wait" was one of the first songs he recorded on it. He scribbled out the lyrics in fifteen minutes as the band was loading up gear to go to rehearse it, and his wife, singer Valerie Day, approved.

Critical reception
John Leland's writeup in a Spin magazine column wrote about the single, saying: "You can listen to this record as many times as you want and still not have any strong impressions that human beings actually made it. In other words, it's the perfect disco record."

Music video
The music video was directed by Jim Blashfield. It contains animations and has a hint of the very surreal. The plot has Valerie Day singing the song sitting at a desk, repairing a coffeepot, while tools and other oddities pass into the frame and out again. Her dog sits nearby, wearing sunglasses.

Charts

Weekly charts

Year-end charts

See also
List of number-one dance hits (United States)

References

1985 songs
1986 debut singles
Atlantic Records singles
Music videos directed by Jim Blashfield
Nu Shooz songs
RPM Top Singles number-one singles